Basacallis is a monotypic snout moth genus. It was described by Everett D. Cashatt in 1969, and contains the species Basacallis tarachodes. It is found in Panama, Florida, Mississippi, Alabama, and South Carolina.

The wingspan is 16–23 mm. The forewings are light gray.

References

Chrysauginae
Monotypic moth genera
Moths of North America
Pyralidae genera